Apospasta pannosa is a moth of the family Noctuidae first described by Frederic Moore in 1881. It is found in Sri Lanka, and India.

References

Moths of Asia
Moths described in 1881
Hadeninae